Kirk Christopher Muller (born February 8, 1966) is a Canadian former professional ice hockey winger who played in the National Hockey League for 19 seasons from 1984–85 until 2002–03. He was also the head coach of the National Hockey League's Carolina Hurricanes from 2011 to 2014. He was an associate coach with the Montreal Canadiens from 2016 to 2021, where he previously served as assistant coach from 2006 to 2011.

Playing career
Muller started his junior career with the Kingston Canadians of the Ontario Hockey League, but his most successful junior seasons were with the Guelph Platers. There was a dispute in 1984 between the Platers and the Canadian Olympic Team, who wanted Muller to play with them at the 1984 Winter Olympics. The Platers owner was upset over losing Muller for so much time, but eventually they came to an agreement and Muller played in the Olympics. He was drafted second overall by the New Jersey Devils in the 1984 NHL Entry Draft behind Mario Lemieux. "Captain Kirk" was the heart and soul of the Devils franchise, with his intensity and strong two-way play. However, although New Jersey had a surprisingly successful run in the 1988 playoffs, they never became a serious Stanley Cup contender while Muller was with them. After walking out of training camp on September 16, 1991, over a contract dispute,  he was traded along with Roland Melanson to the Montreal Canadiens for Stéphane Richer and Tom Chorske on September 20.

Muller quickly became a fan favourite in Montreal, and he helped them win the Stanley Cup in 1993. He was traded to the New York Islanders during the 1994–95 NHL season. Initially, he was reluctant to report to the Islanders, then played a handful of games in an uninterested manner before team management decided that his poor attitude outweighed his potential contributions on the ice and barred him from the team.  Eventually, the Islanders recalled Muller, but he refused to report, freeing the Islanders from their contractual obligations to pay him. Ultimately, Muller was traded at a discount to the Toronto Maple Leafs, in a three team trade that saw Muller and Don Beaupre go to the Maple Leafs, Martin Straka, Ken Belanger and the rights to Bryan Berard go to the Islanders while Damian Rhodes and the rights to Wade Redden went to the Ottawa Senators. Muller had his last 20 goal season with the Maple Leafs the next season, but he was traded to the Florida Panthers for prospect Jason Podollan as the Leafs fell out of the playoff picture.

Muller struggled in Florida, scoring just four goals in the whole 1998–99 NHL season. His last break came when he signed with the Dallas Stars in the middle of the 1999–2000 season. Even though his scoring touch of old almost completely evaporated, he still managed to be a strong role player with the Stars for four seasons and was part of the "grumpy old men" line that included Mike Keane and John MacLean. He retired at the end of the 2002–03 season.

Muller played in 6 NHL All-Star Games (1985, 1986, 1988, 1990, 1992, 1993.)

Coaching career
Muller began his coaching career with the Queen's University Golden Gaels in his hometown of Kingston. During 2005-06, Muller's Golden Gaels posted an 8-13-1-2 record in the Ontario University Athletics Conference.

Muller also held the title of assistant coach to Marc Habscheid with Team Canada, winning the gold medal at the 2005 Lotto Cup Tournament in Slovakia. In March 2006, he served as assistant coach to Greg Gilbert at the Under-18 World Championship.

Muller returned to the Montreal Canadiens on June 20, 2006, when he was named assistant coach of the Canadiens.

On June 27, 2011, the Nashville Predators announced that Muller had been hired as the head coach of their AHL affiliate, the Milwaukee Admirals. On November 28, 2011, Muller became coach of the Carolina Hurricanes, taking over for Paul Maurice. On May 5, 2014, Muller was relieved of his coaching duties by the Carolina Hurricanes. On May 13, 2014, Muller was signed by the St. Louis Blues as an assistant coach.

On June 2, 2016, the Montreal Canadiens rehired Muller as an associate coach.

On August 13, 2020, Muller temporarily replaced head coach Claude Julien who was hospitalized with chest pains.

On February 24, 2021, Muller along with head coach Claude Julien were fired from the Canadiens and former assistant coach Dominique Ducharme took over as interim head coach.

On June 10, 2021 Kirk Muller was named an associate coach for the Calgary Flames under head coach Darryl Sutter.

Records
New Jersey Devils franchise record for points in a single game (6 on Oct. 29, 1986)
New Jersey Devils franchise record for assists in a single game (5 on Mar. 25, 1987)
New Jersey Devils franchise record for points by a centre in a single season (94, 1987–88)

Career statistics

Regular season and playoffs

International

Head coaching record

See also
List of NHL players with 1000 games played

References

External links
 
 
 Total Hockey (Second Edition), Editor - Dan Diamond, 

1966 births
Canadian ice hockey centres
Canadian ice hockey coaches
Carolina Hurricanes coaches
Dallas Stars players
Florida Panthers players
Guelph Platers players
Ice hockey people from Ontario
Ice hockey players at the 1984 Winter Olympics
Kingston Canadians players
Living people
Milwaukee Admirals coaches
Montreal Canadiens coaches
Montreal Canadiens players
National Hockey League All-Stars
National Hockey League assistant coaches
National Hockey League first-round draft picks
New Jersey Devils draft picks
New Jersey Devils players
New York Islanders players
Olympic ice hockey players of Canada
Sportspeople from Kingston, Ontario
St. Louis Blues coaches
Stanley Cup champions
Toronto Maple Leafs players